Chorzów power station is a thermal power plant located in Chorzów, Silesian Voivodeship, Poland. It has been in operation since 1898, since 2003 under the name Elcho.

Currently (2012), the plant produces electrical power (generating capacity of 204 MW) as well as heat (500 MW) for district heating, based on hard coal.

Technical data 
 Two blocks
 Steam flow: 119.1 kg/s per block
 Steam pressure: 13.59 MPa
 Steam temperature: 539 °C

External links 

 https://web.archive.org/web/20111213203745/http://www.cezpolska.pl/pl/cez-w-polsce/ec-elcho-s-a.html (in Polish)
 Gallery with historical images of the power plant and surrounding electricity pylons

Coal-fired power stations in Poland
Buildings and structures in Chorzów
Cogeneration power stations in Poland